Edward Elliott may refer to:

 Edward Bishop Elliott (1793–1875), English clergyman and premillenarian writer
 Edward C. Elliott (1874–1960), American educational researcher and administrator
 Charlie Elliott (jockey) (Edward Charles Elliott, 1904–1979), British Champion flat racing jockey
 Edward E. Elliott ( early to mid 20th century), U.S. legislator from California
 Edward Elliott (songwriter) (1800–1867), English writer of popular humorous songs

See also
 Edward Eliot (disambiguation)
 Ted Elliott (disambiguation)